Vasile Popescu (May 1, 1925 in Bucharest – 2003) was a Romanian basketball player who competed in the 1952 Summer Olympics.

He was part of the Romanian basketball team, which was eliminated in the first round of the 1952 tournament. He played both matches.

References

1925 births
2003 deaths
Basketball players at the 1952 Summer Olympics
Olympic basketball players of Romania
Romanian men's basketball players
Basketball players from Bucharest